IS0 2921 is a specification created by the International Organization for Standardization for a method in determining the temperature-retraction characteristics of stretched vulcanized rubber.

References

02921
Rubber